The 2022 Amstelveen Women's Open was a professional tennis tournament played on outdoor clay courts. It was the second edition of the tournament which was part of the 2022 ITF Women's World Tennis Tour. It took place in Amstelveen, Netherlands between 4 and 10 July 2022.

Champions

Singles

  Simona Waltert def.  Emma Navarro, 7–6(12–10), 6–0

Doubles

  Aliona Bolsova /  Guiomar Maristany def.  Michaela Bayerlová /  Aneta Laboutková, 6–2, 6–2

Singles main draw entrants

Seeds

 1 Rankings are as of 27 June 2022.

Other entrants
The following players received wildcards into the singles main draw:
  Jasmijn Gimbère
  Merel Hoedt
  Lexie Stevens
  Stéphanie Visscher

The following players received entry from the qualifying draw:
  Sara Cakarevic
  Barbara Haas
  Johana Marková
  Tayisiya Morderger
  Erica Oosterhout
  Andreea Prisăcariu
  Diana Shnaider
  Anouck Vrancken Peeters

The following player received entry as a lucky loser:
  Nicole Khirin

References

External links
 2022 Amstelveen Women's Open at ITFtennis.com

2022 ITF Women's World Tennis Tour
2022 in Dutch tennis
July 2022 sports events in the Netherlands